The Communist Party of Trinidad and Tobago was a pro-Albanian Marxist–Leninist political party in Trinidad and Tobago. The party was founded in 1979. One source claims it was founded by Hardial Bains, the leader of Communist Party of Canada (Marxist–Leninist). CPTT published Class Struggle. 

Many of the members of this party renounced their hardline communist stances by the end of the 1980s, coinciding with the Fall of the Soviet Union. Former members Michael Als and Wade Mark were involved in party politics in the late 1990s. Wade Mark is a member of the executive of the United National Congress. Michael Als was a UNC candidate for the 2000 election.

References 

Political parties established in 1979
Communist Party of Trinidad and Tobago
Political parties in Trinidad and Tobago
1979 establishments in Trinidad and Tobago